Star Trek: Nemesis is a 2002 American science fiction film directed by Stuart Baird. It is the tenth film in the Star Trek franchise, as well as the fourth and final film to star the cast of Star Trek: The Next Generation. It was written by John Logan from a story developed by Logan, Brent Spiner, and producer Rick Berman. In the film, which is set in the 24th century, the crew of the USS Enterprise-E are forced to deal with a threat to the United Federation of Planets from a clone of Captain Picard named Shinzon, who has taken control of the Romulan Star Empire in a coup d'état.

Principal photography for the film took place from November 2001 to March 2002. Nemesis held its world premiere at Grauman's Chinese Theatre in Los Angeles on December 9, 2002. The film was released in North America on December 13, 2002 by Paramount Pictures, and received generally mixed reviews, with publications criticizing it for being the least successful in the franchise. The film was a box office failure, earning $67 million worldwide against a $60 million budget. Plans for a final film featuring The Next Generation cast were scrapped, and the film series was rebooted instead with Star Trek in 2009, which was a box office success. The television series Star Trek: Picard, a continuation of The Next Generation and Nemesis set two decades after the latter at the end of the 24th century, premiered in 2020.

Plot
On Romulus, members of the Romulan Senate debate terms of peace and alliance from the Reman rebel leader Shinzon. The Remans are a slave race of the Romulan Empire from the neighboring planet Remus, used as miners and cannon fodder. While a faction of the military supports Shinzon, the Praetor and Senate are opposed to an alliance. After rejecting the motion, the Praetor and senators are disintegrated by a device left in the room.

Meanwhile, the crew of the Starship Enterprise prepare to bid farewell to newly-married officers William Riker and Deanna Troi. The android officer Data serenades the couple with a rendition of "Blue Skies" at a reception. En route to the ceremony, they discover an energy reading on the planet Kolarus III near the Romulan Neutral Zone. Captain Jean-Luc Picard, security officer Worf, and Data land on the planet and discover the remnants of an android resembling Data, named B-4. The trio are attacked by the native population, and leave the planet with B-4, which they deduce to be an earlier Soong type Android.

Enterprise is ordered on a diplomatic mission to Romulus, where Shinzon has taken over the Empire and professes a desire for peace with the Federation. On arrival, they learn Shinzon is a clone of Picard, secretly created by the Romulans to plant a high-ranking spy into the Federation. The project was abandoned when Shinzon was still a child, and he was left on Remus to die as a slave. After many years, Shinzon became a leader of the Remans, and constructed a heavily armed flagship, Scimitar. The Enterprise crew discover that Scimitar is producing low levels of deadly thalaron radiation, the same radiation used to wipe out the Romulan Senate. There are also unexpected attempts to communicate with the Enterprise computers, and Shinzon invades Troi's mind through the telepathy of his Reman viceroy.

Medical officer Doctor Beverly Crusher discovers that Shinzon is dying rapidly because of the process used to clone him, and the only possible treatment is a transfusion of Picard's blood. Shinzon kidnaps Picard and B-4, having planted the android on Kolarus as a lure. Data reveals he swapped places with B-4, and rescues Picard. They determine Shinzon plans to use Scimitar to invade the Federation, using its thalaron radiation generator to eradicate all life on Earth.

Enterprise races back to Federation space, but is ambushed by Scimitar in the Bassen Rift, a region which prevents subspace communication. Despite the aid of two Romulan Warbirds, Enterprise is heavily damaged. Picard rams his ship into Scimitar, crippling both vessels. Shinzon activates the thalaron weapon in an act of mutually assured destruction. Picard boards Scimitar alone to face Shinzon, and kills him by impaling him on a metal strut. With Enterprises transporters down, Data leaps the distance between the two ships equipped with an emergency transporter, beaming Picard off the ship, and sacrifices himself to destroy the thalaron generator and Scimitar with it. The crew mourn Data, and the surviving Romulan commander, Donatra, offers them her gratitude for saving the Empire.

Back at Earth, Picard bids farewell to Riker, who is leaving with Troi to command the USS Titan. Picard meets with B-4, and discovers that, before he boarded the Scimitar, Data downloaded his memories into B-4, allowing him to live on. As B-4 starts singing "Blue Skies", Picard leaves B-4's quarters and smiles.

Cast

Production

Casting 
Baird and Berman had been searching for someone who resembled Patrick Stewart but looked about 25 years younger; at one point they considered Jude Law. Baird specifically wanted an unknown actor, and Hardy auditioned by tape after Stewart asked Hardy's agent if he thought any of his clients were suitable for the role. Hardy was filming Simon: An English Legionnaire in Morocco at the time, and decided against using the requested text for the audition. Instead, he got possession of a full script for Nemesis, used a different part of the script, and filmed it partly nude. He was flown to Los Angeles to do a screen test with Stewart; Hardy later described his performance there as "appalling". However, he had recorded himself performing the same piece in a hotel room the night before, and gave that tape to Baird, resulting in his being cast as Shinzon a few days later.

Sirtis was "ecstatic" about the role Troi plays in the movie. She was pleased with the wedding scene, saying that the dress she wore for Nemesis was nicer than the one she wore at her actual wedding. She was happy to work once again with Wil Wheaton and Whoopi Goldberg, but felt that the film would be the last one with the entire cast of The Next Generation. She remained certain that it would not be the last Star Trek film to be made, as she thought that Paramount would want to make a film involving a variety of characters from the different Star Trek series.

Perlman and Hardy became friends on the set. Perlman said in an interview eight years after the release of the film, "I loved him when I first met him. I loved working with him. I found him to be really smart, really a great kid."

Development and filming

Principal photography began in December 2001 in Southern California.

In promotional interviews for the film, Patrick Stewart stated that room for a sequel was intentionally left.

Direction and writing
Stuart Baird was brought in to direct Nemesis by executive producer Rick Berman. It was Baird's third film following US Marshals and Executive Decision, although he had directed a variety of second units previously. Baird did not have a background in Star Trek; he was aware of the films and television series but did not consider himself an expert on the subject. Berman explained that Baird would bring "fresh blood" to the film and that Berman had enjoyed "the sense of fun and action that existed in Executive Decision." Baird said in a promotional interview that this resulted in a non-typical Baird film, saying that it was "perhaps a little different from the dynamics of the previous films." He wanted to add energy to the action scenes and added some set pieces, such as the car chase. He called that scene a "signature piece" for the film, which turns dark after the crew is put in danger by the inhabitants of the planet. He also found that the cast would discuss any issues they had with the direction he gave to their characters. Despite Frakes' being in the cast and having directed the previous two Star Trek films, Baird decided not to seek his opinion on the direction of the film. He said that there was no resentment on set, noting that Frakes was completing work on directing Clockstoppers at the time and so likely could not have taken on directing Nemesis even if Baird had not been given the job. Baird had hoped that Nemesis would be enough of a success that he could consider whether to take the lead on a future, eleventh Star Trek film.

Make-up and effects
The make-up team sought to make Hardy look more similar to Stewart by creating latex prosthetics from moulds of the latter's face. These included numerous versions of noses and chins, and in order to reduce the visible size of Hardy's lips a fake scar was added.

Special effects were done by Digital Domain. Although the majority of the exterior shots of ships were computer generated, a practical 17-foot Enterprise saucer was built and collided into a model of the Scimitar for the film's climax.

Music

The music to Star Trek: Nemesis was composed and conducted by Jerry Goldsmith, who composed previous entries in the franchise, such as the Academy Award-nominated score for Star Trek: The Motion Picture, Star Trek V: The Final Frontier, Star Trek: First Contact, and Star Trek: Insurrection, as well as the themes to the television series Star Trek: The Next Generation (arranged by Dennis McCarthy) and Star Trek: Voyager. One of the final works written before his death in 2004, Goldsmith had also previously collaborated with Baird on Executive Decision and U.S. Marshals.

The score opens with airy synthesizers under a trumpet performing an augmented triad before preceding into Alexander Courage's Star Trek: The Original Series fanfare. The score then quickly transitions into a much darker theme to accompany the conflict between the Reman and Romulan empires. Goldsmith also composed a new 5-note theme to accompany the character Shinzon and the Scimitar, which is manipulated throughout the score to reflect the multiple dimensions of the character. The score is book-ended with Goldsmith's theme from Star Trek: The Motion Picture, following a brief excerpt from the song "Blue Skies" by Irving Berlin and the original Star Trek fanfare.

Release

Marketing
Nemesis had comparatively little marketing, despite releasing so long after the previous film. Merchandise included a line of action figures, a trading card set, soundtrack, novelization, and tie-in official magazines. Regional food promotions with Safeway Grocery Stores and Del Taco occurred in Southern California.

Box office

The premiere of Star Trek: Nemesis took place at Grauman's Chinese Theatre in Los Angeles on December 9, 2002. It was attended by the cast and crew, with the exception of Jonathan Frakes who was away directing the film Thunderbirds. The after party was held in the Kodak Theatre complex. Nemesis was released on December 13, 2002, in direct competition with Harry Potter and the Chamber of Secrets (released November 15, 2002), the 20th James Bond film Die Another Day (released November 22, 2002), and The Lord of the Rings: The Two Towers (released December 18, 2002). Producer Rick Berman has suggested that Nemesiss performance may have been negatively affected by "the competition of other films". This poor performance was predicted by reviewers, due to the short period in the film's release before The Two Towers was released. The film's gross domestic income was the lowest of the franchise at $43,254,409 as of September 2008. It opened at #2 in the US box office ($200,000 behind Maid in Manhattan) and was the first Trek film not to debut as the highest-grossing film of the week. It earned a total of $67,312,826 worldwide, against a production budget of $60 million.

Home media

On May 20, 2003, Nemesis was released on DVD in both anamorphic widescreen and full screen editions in Region 1, and was also released on VHS. The initial DVD release contained an audio commentary by director Stuart Baird, four featurettes on the film's production, seven deleted scenes, a photo gallery, and a preview for Star Trek: Deep Space Nine on DVD at Amazon.com. Also on October 4, 2005, Star Trek: Nemesis was released on UMD in widescreen for Region 1 only; it is the only Star Trek ever released on UMD. The initial release was followed up with a "Special Collector's Edition" in Region 1 on October 4, 2005. Although this two-disc set contained several additional features, it also duplicated some of the features found in the initial release. The film was released on Blu-ray on September 22, 2009 as part of the Star Trek: The Next Generation Motion Picture Collection in the United States. It was subsequently released individually in Japan and the United Kingdom. The Blu-ray edition contains high definition bonus features not seen on previous DVD releases.

Reception
Nemesis received generally negative reviews. Review aggregation website Rotten Tomatoes gave the film a critic rating of 38%, based on 170 reviews. This was the second-lowest rating, behind Star Trek V: The Final Frontier.  On Metacritic it has a score of 51% based on reviews from 29 critics, indicating "mixed or average reviews". 
Audiences surveyed by CinemaScore gave the film a grade "A−" on scale of A to F.

Roger Ebert of the Chicago Sun-Times had mixed feelings about the film, stating, "I'm smiling like a good sport and trying to get with the dialogue ... and gradually it occurs to me that 'Star Trek' is over for me. I've been looking at these stories for half a lifetime, and, let's face it, they're out of gas." Ebert gave the film two out of four stars.
Mick LaSalle of the San Francisco Chronicle said that the film is a "rather harebrained story that's relieved to a degree only by some striking visual effects and by Patrick Stewart's outstanding presence as Picard". LaSalle complained that Stewart gave "integrity and wry stoicism to Nemesis, but the movie [was] unworthy of him". Owen Gleiberman of Entertainment Weekly gave the film a positive review, commenting that the crew "indulge[s] the force of humanity over hardware in a way that George Lucas had forgotten." Gleiberman gave the film a "B−". Stephen Holden of The New York Times said that the film is a "klutzy affair whose warm, fuzzy heart emits intermittent bleats from the sleeve of its gleaming spacesuit". Holden praised the scenes where the Enterprise and the Scimitar ram into each other during the final battle.

The film was nominated for the Saturn Awards for Best Science Fiction Film and Best Costume but lost to both Minority Report and Star Wars: Episode II – Attack of the Clones, respectively, while Hardy was nominated for Best Supporting Actor but lost out to Andy Serkis for his role in The Lord of the Rings: The Two Towers.

The movie was not well-loved among the cast, with LeVar Burton and Marina Sirtis speaking unflatteringly of Baird. Frakes said that if he himself had directed Nemesis, he would have made the film less villain-centric and given more screen time to the regular Next Generation cast.
Patrick Stewart later described Nemesis as a "pretty weak" finale for The Next Generation.

Some of the events of the film would later be followed up on in the 2020 television series Star Trek: Picard, set twenty years after the events of Nemesis.

References

Further reading

External links

 
 
  

2002 films
2002 science fiction action films
American films about revenge
American science fiction action films
American sequel films
American space adventure films
Android (robot) films
Films about cloning
Films about coups d'état
Nemesis
Films directed by Stuart Baird
Films scored by Jerry Goldsmith
Films set in the 24th century
Films set in the future
Films shot in California
Films produced by Rick Berman
Films with screenplays by Brent Spiner
Films with screenplays by John Logan
Films with screenplays by Rick Berman
Paramount Pictures films
2000s English-language films
2000s American films